Kirby may refer to:

Buildings
 Kirby Building, a skyscraper in Dallas, Texas, United States
 Kirby Hall, an Elizabethan country house near Corby, Northamptonshire, England
 Kirby House (disambiguation), various houses in England and the United States
 Kirby Sports Center, a sports arena in Easton, Pennsylvania, United States
 Kirby's Mill, an historic grist mill in Medford, New Jersey, United States

Businesses
 Kirby Building Systems, a manufacturer of pre-engineered buildings
 Kirby Corporation, maritime equipment corporation
 Kirby Company, manufacturer of Kirby vacuum cleaners
 Kirby's Pig Stand, the first drive-in restaurant in the United States

Entertainment
 Kirby (series), a video game series
 Kirby (character), the titular character
 the title character of Rip Kirby, an American comic strip
 the Kirby family in the play You Can't Take It with You
 Kirby, a character in The Brave Little Toaster
 Kirby, a character in Chicken Little
 "Kirby", a song from the album  The Impossible Kid by Aesop Rock
 "Kirby" (Dynasty), an episode of the television series Dynasty

Places

United States 
 Kirby, Arkansas, an unincorporated census-designated place
 Kirby, Indiana, an unincorporated community
 Kirby, Missouri, an unincorporated community
 Kirby, Montana, a populated place
 Kirby, Ohio, a village
 Kirby, Texas, a city
 Kirby, Vermont, a town
 Kirby, West Virginia, an unincorporated community
 Kirby, Wisconsin, an unincorporated community
 Kirby, Wyoming, a town
 Kirby Lake, Abilene, Texas, a man-made reservoir

United Kingdom 
 Horton Kirby, a village in Kent
 Kirby Bedon, a village in Norfolk
 Kirby Cane, a village in Norfolk
 Kirby Cross, a village in Essex
 Kirby Grindalythe, a village in North Yorkshire
 Kirby-le-Soken, a village in Essex, England
 Kirby Muxloe, a village and civil parish west of Leicester, England
 West Kirby, a town in Merseyside, UK
 Kirby Hill (disambiguation)

Elsewhere 
 Kirby, Ontario, a hamlet in Canada
 Kirby Cone, a peak in Marie Byrd Land, Antarctica

People
 Kirby (surname), people with the surname
 Kirby (given name), people with the given name
 Kirby Lauryen Dockery, singer-songwriter also known simply as Kirby

Other uses
 Kirby calculus
 Kirby (cucumber), used for pickling
 Kirby 23, a sailboat designed by Bruce Kirby and produced in the mid-1980s
 Kirby 25, a sailboat designed by Bruce Kirby and produced in the mid-1980s
 Kirby Award, an award presented from 1985 to 1987 for achievements in comic books
 Kirby College of Further Education, now part of Middlesbrough College, North Yorkshire, England
 Kirby Forensic Psychiatric Center, a psychiatric hospital in New York City
 Kirby High School (disambiguation)
 51985 Kirby, an asteroid named after Jack Kirby
 Loteki Supernatural Being (1990–2007), also known as Kirby, the only dog to have won all three major international dog shows in the same year

See also
 Kirby Krackle (or Kirby Dots), an artistic convention in comic books
 Kerby (disambiguation)
 Kirkby (disambiguation)